Mrs. Hitler is an Indian Malayalam language romantic comedy-drama television show airing on Zee Keralam from 19 April 2021 and also digitally available on ZEE5. The series stars Meghna Vincent and Shanavas Shanu /Arun G Raghavan in the lead roles. It is an official remake of Hindi television series Guddan Tumse Na Ho Payega. It is one of the top rated shows of Zee Keralam.

Plot
Jyothirmayi, a kind-hearted girl who belongs to an ordinary family was raised by her step-mother Ashalatha and her father Sudhakaran after her mother died when she was young. She is very caring towards her half-sister Priya who is a skilled baker. Devakrishnan, also known as DK, belongs to a wealthy family and is the son of Padmavatiamma. He adopted three sons: Sreeram, Gokul and Balu, their wives are Maya, Thara and Chithra respectively. DK is also known as Hitler because of his arrogant attitude towards others. He lost his first wife Supriya and still lives in her memories.

Every year DK gets a letter from his late wife telling him what he has to do, Supriya gave all these letters to her good friend Pournami who would pass them on to DK. In the letter that he received after his 40th birthday, Supriya had written that he must find a new wife and get married in 15 days as she wants him to live happily. Padmavatiamma had been praying for years that her son would get married and he finally agreed to fulfil Supriya's wish. His three daughters-in-law were excited to have a new mother-in-law. They held 'Bride Interviews' as they only had a short amount of time to find a suitable wife for DK. Jyothirmayi was attending an audition for a film about 'Ramleela' as the character Seetha at the same place the 'Bride Interviews' were being held. Jyothirmayi went to the wrong place and she was interviewed to be a bride for DK. Thara wanted her cousin Sithara to be her new mother-in-law. Maya and Chithra both were impressed by Jyothirmayi's answers in the interview and chose her. However they did not know it was Jyothirmayi as she had used a different name- Janaki because she knew that they wouldn't let her be a part of the film because of the embarrassment she had caused to the Amaravati family. Jyothirmayi came to find that she attended the wrong interview and she left Amaravati. Later a false headline was published in the newspaper about DK and Jyothirmayi by Chithra. She came to the Amaravati house where DK was meeting Sithara and Jyothirmayi humiliated DK and his family. DK doesn't like Sithara and tells her to leave their home immediately.

Later, DK realises that Jyothirmayi is a good person and decides to marry her. He asks her once but she refuses because of his seven ridiculous conditions for his wife. Jyothirmayi's sister Priya fell in love with Avinash, a married man, Jyothirmayi told Priya to end things with him but she doesn't listen. Later, Priya attempts suicide for Avinash and she is rushed to the hospital but they say they won't treat her there but DK comes to the rescue and Priya's life has been saved. Jyothirmayi learns that DK helped her sister and then asks him for more help to save Priya from Avinash. DK agrees to help her and asks for a favour in return and Jyothirmayi agrees to do anything he says. Avinash breaks up with Priya and apologises.

A few days later, it is Padmavatiamma birthday and DK said he will announce who his second-wife will be. He had not told any one who it would be except his good friend Pournami. He announces that he second-wife will be Jyothirmayi and she is shocked. Padmavatiamma and Ashalatha are overjoyed but DK's three daughters-in-law are furious as they despise Jyothirmayi.

Cast

Main 
 Meghna Vincent as Jyothirmayi Devakrishna "Jyothi" (Mrs. Hitler) 
 A kind-hearted, jovial and easy-going girl; Bhanumathi and Sudhakaran's daughter; Asha's step daughter; Priya's step sister; DK's second wife.
 Shanavas Shanu (Episode 1-253)/Arun G Raghavan (Episode 253-present) as Deva Krishna "DK" (Hitler)
 A single and widower man; Padmavathiyamma's son; Maya, Thara and Chitra's parental father-in-law; Supriya's former husband and Jyothirmayi's husband.

Recurring 
Ponnamma Babu as Padmavathiyamma
(DK's mother and Jyothi's mother-in-law) 
Firoz Khan as Shiva Krishna (SK)
(Padmavatiyamma's second son, DK's brother and Jyothi's brother-in-law) 
Anjali Rao as Maya
(DK's first daughter-in-law, Sreeram's wife)
Sruthy Surendran (Manve) as Thara 
(DK's second daughter-in-law, Gokul's wife)
Akshaya Raghavan as Chitra
(DK's third daughter-in-law, Balu's wife)
Archana Manoj as Asha Latha
(Sudhakaran's second wife, Priya's mother and Jyothi's step-mother)
Munshi Renjith as Sudhakaran
(Jyothi and Priya's father and Asha's husband)  
Alice Christy as Priya
(Sudhakaran and Asha's daughter and Jyothi's sister)
Alif Shah/Mithun as Sreeram
(Maya's husband)
Syam Namboothiri as Gokul 
(Thara's husband)
Vinayak as Balu
Chithra's husband
Daveed John as Circle Inspector Avinash
A Womenizer ,Chithra's elder brother, Soorya's husband
Lakshmi Surendran as Sithara
Thara's sister and DK's ex-fiancée
Renjusha Menon as Vyjayanthi
Murthi's wife and DK's enemy
Shalu Menon as Hiranmayi
Tom Mattel as Jayaprakash 
Akhil Anand as M P Vignesh
Riya Isha as Annmary john IPS

Cameo 
 Jaseela Parveen/Souparnika Subhash as Supriya: DK's first wife (alive)
Manjula Paritala/Jaseela Parveen as Supriya  (dead and photo presence)
Sudha as Bhanumathi: Jyothi's mother (dead and photo presence)
Anusree as Anu : DK's friend (Kalyanam episodes)
Richard Jose as Sidharth 
Swathy Nithyanand as Aparna
Krishnapriya K Nair as Tulasi 
Sajeesh Nambiar as Adhi

Guest appearance in promo
Swasika as Nila
Shiju Abdul Rasheed as Ravivarman
Stebin as Anand Krishnan
Vivek Gopan as Arun
Mridula Vijay as Samyuktha
Arun G Raghavan as Abhimanyu

Adaptations

References

2021 Indian television series debuts
Zee Keralam original programming